Citharichthys fragilis, the Gulf sanddab, is a species of sanddab in the large-tooth flounder family Paralichthyidae. It is native to the eastern Pacific Ocean, ranging from the coast of Manhattan Beach, California in the north to the Gulf of California in the south.

Like the rest of the large-tooth flounders, it has both eyes on the left side of its head. It is brownish in colour, both the body and fins are mottled with darker patches. Its underside is a pale colour.

It is a game fish of minor commercial importance.

Citharichthys fragilis preys on crustaceans, benthic worms, and small bony fishes.

References

Notes 

Citharichthys
Western North American coastal fauna
Fish of Mexican Pacific coast
Fish of the Western United States
Fauna of California
Fish described in 1890